Toys Went Berserk were an Australian post-punk outfit that formed in late 1985. They released two studio albums, The Smiler with a Knife (1989) and Sensory (1990), before disbanding in early 1992. They subsequently reformed in 1998, 2005 and 2016.

History 

Toys Went Berserk were formed in Sydney in December 1985 by Lesley-Anne "Coo" Bennett on lead vocals and piano (ex-Lavender Disaster), Andy Jarvis on guitar (ex-Dusk Furrow), Mark Nicholson on drums (ex-Happy Hate Me Nots), Bill Quarry on bass guitar (ex-Box of Fish), and Steve Turbit on guitar. Lavender Disaster were a Perth-based band with Coo Bennett on lead vocals, Brett Ford on drums, Peter Hartley on guitar and Danny Vervest on bass. Both Ford and Hartley were later members of the Kryptonics and Lubricated Goat. Bruce Griffiths told Steve Gardner of Noise for Heroes that the group, "sounded like a 'tough Blondie'."

According to Australian musicologist, Ian McFarlane, Toys Went Berserk "derived [their] moniker from a lyric line in the Siouxsie and the Banshees song 'Spellbound'." They provided energetic live performances and their music (comparable to bands such as Skeletal Family, Siouxsie and the Banshees and Xmal Deutschland), which was quite distinctive in the Sydney scene of the time. Gardner opined, "They aren't like the standard Sydney band, influenced by Detroit music, 'Burn My Eye' T-shirt on back, stacks of Marshalls behind them. They have other influences. As opposed to big distorted power chords or strong leads, the guitar tends to be more in the way of textured, treated chords; very echo-ey. The drumming is inventive yet driving, with many interesting touches to add spice to standard beats. The bass tends to be mixed back, while Coo's vocal provide a large part of the character and melody to the songs."

The group's first recorded track, "One Day (My Head Is Going to Explode)", appeared on a various artists' four-track extended play, Trousers in Action No. 2 (August 1986), via Aberrant Records. It was previously performed by Lavender Disaster and was written by Coo's brother Phil Bennett; it was recorded at Sound Barrier studios in June with Jonathan Summers as audio engineer. This was followed by their debut single, "Guns at My Head" (October), which had been recorded at the same session as "One Day" and in early 1987 by an 8 song double 12" EP "Pieces", also recorded at Sound Barrier. In June 1987 Turbit was replaced briefly on guitar by Carolyn Polley.

Toys Went Berserk issued their first full-length studio album, The Smiler with a Knife, on 7 November 1989 with Rob Younger (Died Pretty, Dubrovniks, The Plunderers) producing at Trafalgar Studios in June and July of that year. Gardner felt, "[it] features the sort of clear and solid sound that he's becoming famous for. Yet the band had a lot of misgivings about using him at first; they are not at all interested in the Detroit sound, and they associated Younger with that through his Birdman past. And although the new lp certainly isn't a Detroit metal record, there's no question it has a tougher, more immediate sound."

Before the album was recorded Polley had left to join indie rockers Big Heavy Stuff and Toys Went Berserk continued as a four-piece. They released numerous records, including six singles and three albums (two on vinyl and one CD), and toured in the United States and Australia. Their goth-influenced version of Led Zeppelin's "Stairway to Heaven" was featured on Andrew Denton's ABC-TV program, The Money or the Gun, and was later released on a various artists compilation album, Stairways to Heaven (1993).

The band recorded their second studio album, Sensory(1990), at Fort Apache Studios, near Boston, with Gary Smith (Throwing Muses, Pixies, the Chills) in August. They returned to the US in the following year to tour. They have supported international acts the Cramps, the Sugarcubes, the Fall, Dinosaur Jr. and the Selector during their six-year lifetime. Toys Went Berserk split in early 1992.

Afterwards 

Following the break-up of Toys Went Berserk, Bennett and Jarvis, who were domestic partners, moved to England and started new bands, Feast (1993–98) and then Houdini (1998–2001). In late 2003 they returned to Perth to start their own record label, Trickster Music and released an album as Houdini Twins. Toys Went Berserk have regrouped for reunion shows: firstly in 1998, then in 2005, to promote the release of a compilation double album, The Bitter & the Sweet: Best and Rarest. It included most of their studio releases, plus selected demos and live recordings. In 2016 the band performed a joint 30th anniversary show in Sydney, with contemporaries, Ratcat.

Bennett and Jarvis continued in other Perth-based outfits, Rocket to Memphis (RTM) and Catzilla. RTM released four CDs of swamp, rockabilly and garage rock n roll music, Swampwater Shuffle (2007), Hip-Shakin' Voodoo (2009), "Jungle Juice" (2011) and "Do the Crawl" (2013) and two vinyl singles, "I'm Bad" (2011) and "Go Go" (2013), and toured both Japan and the United Kingdom. Catzilla play garage rock n roll, featuring Bennett on vocals and keyboards and Jarvis on guitar. They released a vinyl EP, Going Wild (2016), a self-titled album in 2017 and have also toured Japan.

Discography

Studio albums 

The Smiler with a Knife (1989) Aberrant Records
Sensory (1990) Aberrant Records

Compilation albums 

 Pieces (1989) Aberrant Records - re-released to include the band's first single
 The Bitter & the Sweet – Best & Rarest 
This 42-track, double CD compilation of this mid-'80's/early '90s Sydney pop foursome features a 16-page booklet with liners, photos and artwork.

Extended plays 

 Pieces (1987) Aberrant Records - 8 track mini-album released as a double 12" EP
 Have No More (1989) Aberrant Records - 12"

Singles 

 "Don't Run Away"/"Guns at My Head" (1986) 7" Aberrant Records
 "No Warning"/"Inseparable" (1988) 7"
 "Forever & a Day"/"Something Better" (1988) 7"
 "Brand New Life"/"Stairway to Heaven" (1990) 7"
 "Wheels in Motion"/"Spot" (1990) 7"

References

External links 

 

New South Wales musical groups
Australian punk rock groups
Australian post-punk groups